Analecta Hibernica is the official academic journal of the Irish Manuscripts Commission, carrying reports on the commission's work and publishing shorter manuscripts. It was established in 1930 and is edited by James Kelly.

References

Analecta Hibernica at JSTOR

Publications established in 1930
English-language journals
Annual journals
Irish history journals
1930 establishments in Ireland